In Ancient Greek kētŏs (plural kētē=kētea), Latinized as cetus (pl. ceti or cetē = cetea), is any huge sea creature or sea monster. According to the mythology,  Perseus slew Cetus to save Andromeda from being sacrificed to it. The term cetacean (for whale) derives from cetus. In Greek art, ceti were depicted as serpentine fish. The name of the mythological figure Ceto is derived from kētos. The name of the constellation Cetus also derives from this word.

Depictions
The Cetus was variously described as a sea monster or sea serpent. Other versions describe Cetus as a monster with the head of a boar or a greyhound and the body of a whale or dolphin, and a divided, fan-like tail.

There are notable physical and mythological similarities between cetus and drakōn (the dragons in Greek mythology), and, to a lesser extent, other monsters of Greek myth, such as Scylla, Charybdis,  and Medusa and her Gorgon sisters.

Greek mythology

Cetus is often depicted fighting Perseus or as the mount of a Nereid.

Queen Cassiopeia boasted that she and her daughter Andromeda were more beautiful than the Nērēides (in most later works called by the Roman form, the Nereids), which invoked the wrath of Poseidon who sent the sea monster kētŏs (in a far greater number of European works renamed as the Latinised Cetus) to attack Æthiopia. Upon consulting a wise oracle, King Cepheus and Queen Cassiopeia were told to sacrifice Andromeda to Cetus. They had Andromeda chained to a rock near the ocean so that Cetus could devour her. After finding Andromeda chained to the rock and learning of her plight, Perseus managed to slay Cetus when the creature emerged from the ocean to devour her. According to one version, Perseus drove his sword into Cetus's back, while according to another version, he used Medusa's head to turn the monster into stone.

In a different story, Heracles slew Cetus to save Hesione.

Cetus had also been portrayed to support Ino and Melicertes when they threw themselves into the sea instead of a dolphin to carry Palaemon.

Etruscan mythology
In Etruscan mythology, Cetus was regarded as a psychopomp, being depicted frequently on sarcophagi and urns, along with dolphins and hippocamps.

Furthermore, the Etruscan deity Nethuns is sometimes shown wearing a headdress depicting the cetus.

Bible and Jewish mythology

The tannin sea monsters
The monster tannin in the Hebrew Bible has been translated as Greek kētos in the Septuagint, and cetus in the Latin Vulgate.

Tanninim (-im denotes Hebraic plural) appear in the Hebrew Book of Genesis, Exodus, Deuteronomy, Psalms, Job, Ezekiel, Isaiah, and Jeremiah. They are explicitly listed among the creatures created by God on the fifth day of the Genesis creation narrative, translated in the King James Version as "great whales". The tannin is listed in the apocalypse of Isaiah as among the sea beasts to be slain by Yahweh "on that day", translated in the King James Version as "the dragon".

Conflation with Leviathan and Rahab
In Jewish mythology, Tannin is sometimes conflated with the related sea monsters Leviathan and Rahab. Along with Rahab, "Tannin" was a name applied to ancient Egypt after the Exodus to Canaan. Joseph Eddy Fontenrose noted that cetus was a counterpart of Tiamat-based Medusa, and was modelled after Yam and Mot and Leviathan.

Jonah's "great fish"
In Jonah 2:1 (1:17 in English translation), the Hebrew text reads dag gadol, which literally means "great fish". The Septuagint translates this phrase into Greek as mega kētos. This was at the start of more widespread depiction of real whales in Greece and kētos would cover proven whales, sharks and the old meaning of curious sea monsters. Jerome later translated this phrase as piscis grandis in his Latin Vulgate. However, he translated the Greek word kētos as cetus in Gospel of Matthew 12:40. The English opts for the former: "For as Jonah was three days and three nights in the belly of a huge fish, so the Son of Man will be three days and three nights in the heart of the earth."

In other cultures
Art historian John Boardman conjectured that images of the kētos in Central Asia influenced depictions of the Chinese Dragon and Indian makara. They suggest that after contact with Silk Road images of the kētos, the Chinese dragon appeared more reptilian and shifted head-shape; the Pig dragon with the head of a boar compared to the reptilian head of modern dragons that of a camel.

Ships and sailing
Cetus or megakētēs (μεγακήτης) is commonly used as a ship's name or figurehead denoting a ship unafraid of the sea or a ruthless pirate ship to be feared. Ceti were widely viewed as misfortune or bad omen by sailors widely influenced by the Mediterranean traditions such as the bringer of a great storm or general harbinger. Lore and tales associated it with lost cargo and being swept off course, even pirates being allied with such creatures so as to become taboo aboard vessels.

See also
Ketu (mythology)
Makara
Kraken
Tannin (monster)
Black Tortoise - Cetus and the Black Tortoise correspond in astrology, as both creatures possess affinities to water and travel in the underworld to guide people (see also: Cetus in Chinese astronomy)

Notes

References
Citations

Bibliography

External links

Theoi Project - Ketea

Greek dragons
Greek sea gods
Mythological aquatic creatures
Monsters in Greek mythology
Sea monsters
Fish in religion